For information on all Lamar University sports, see Lamar Cardinals and Lady Cardinals

The 2016 Lamar Cardinals baseball team represented Lamar University in the 2016 NCAA Division I baseball season.  The Cardinals played their home games at Vincent–Beck Stadium and are members of the Southland Conference.  The team was coached by Jim Gilligan in his 39th and final season at Lamar.

Previous season
In 2015, the Cardinals  finished the season 11th in the Southland with a record of 21–31, 9–18 in conference play. They failed to qualify for the 2015 Southland Conference baseball tournament.

Roster

Coaches

Preseason

Staff changes
On September 21, 2015, the Cardinals head coach, Jim Gilligan, announced he will be retiring at the conclusion of the 2016 season.

On January 15, 2016, Will Davis was named Jim Gilligan's successor beginning with the 2017 season.  Davis was an assistant coach at LSU.  Will Davis joined the Lamar coaching staff as an assistant coach as the Cardinals' third base and running coach on February 11, 2016.  He fills the position left by Jim Ricklefsen's departure following 18 years as an assistant coach.

Preseason predictions and honors
The Cardinals were predicted to finish 9th in the Southland in the preseason Coaches and Sports Information Director polls.

On February 10, two Cardinals were named to preseason Southland Conference All-Conference teams.  Stijn van der Meer, playing short stop for the Cardinals, was named as a 1st Team All-Conference member, and Jake Nash, as third baseman was named as 2nd Team All-Conference member.

Season

February
The Cardinals began Coach Jim Gilligan's final season with six straight wins sweeping Southeast Missouri State and with wins over #23 Arizona and #7 LSU and one win over North Dakota State.  The game against LSU set a new attendance record for Vincent-Beck Stadium with 3,563 fans in attendance.  On the downside, the Cardinals finished the month and the North Dakota State series with three straight losses to the Bison.

The Cardinals finished the month with an overall 6–3 record.

March
The month started with a win against Prairie View A&M, a 2–1 split series against UTRGV, a 1–2 series split against Northwestern State to begin conference play, followed by a loss to Houston.  The month ended with a seven-game winning streak sweeping Central Arkansas and New Orleans in conference play as well as a non-conference win against Texas.

The Cardinals had an 11–4 record for the month of March for a cumulative record of 17–7.  They also ended the month with a 7–2 record in Southland Conference play.  The month ended with a 7-game winning streak.

April
The Cardinals continued the winning streak in April winning the first 8 games of the month.  The winning streak ended at 15 straight following a 3–6 loss to the Baylor Bears in Waco.  The Cardinals were ranked #25 in the April 11 Collegiate Baseball poll.  The team dropped out of the poll following the loss to Baylor plus two losses to McNeese State.  The Cardinals ended the month with a 14–3 record for the month.  The cumulative record was 31-10.  In conference play, the Cardinals had a 9–3 record for the month and a cumulative record of 16–5.

May
May saw the Cardinals opening the month with a 5-game losing streak.  The team ended the regular season with a 4–7 record and an overall regular season record of 35-17.  In conference play, the Cardinals had a 4–5 record for the month with a final conference record of 20-10.

The Cardinals qualified for the 2016 Southland Conference baseball tournament as the 4th seed.  The Cardinals were eliminated from the tournament after losing their second game.  Including tournament play, the Cardinals finished the 2016 season with a 35–19 overall record.

Post Season

Post Season Honors
Robin Adames was selected as a Louisville Slugger Freshman All-American.

Reid Russell was named Southland Conference Hitter of the Year.  Stijn van de Meer, Will Hibbs, and Reid Russel were named to the first team Southland Conference All-Conference team.  Jake Nash was named as a third team SLC All-Conference member.  Jacob Middleton and Jimmy Johnson received SLC Honorable Mention honors.

Reid Russell was named to the American Baseball Coaches Association Rawlings South Central All-Region first team.

Reid Russell was one of eight Division I players invited to the 3rd annual College Home Run Derby at TD Ameritrade Park Omaha in Omaha, Nebraska.  Russell finished the derby in 3rd place after competing in the semi-final round; missing the final round by one home run.

Major League Draft and Free Agents
Major League Draft - Two Cardinals were selected in the Major League Baseball draft.  Will Hibbs was a 19th round selection by the Philadelphia Phillies.  Stijn van de Meer was selected by the Houston Astros in the 34th round.
Free Agents - Enrique Oquendo signed a free agent contract with Los Angeles Angels shortly after the MLB draft.  Jason McKinley signed a free agent contract with the Tampa Bay Rays on June 20.

Schedule

References

Lamar Cardinals baseball seasons
Lamar
Lamar Cardinals baseball team